Jaime Andrés Barrientos Rivera (born 20 May 1980) is a Chilean former footballer and current manager.

Honours

Player
Provincial Osorno
 Primera B (1): 2007

External links
 
 

1980 births
Living people
Chilean footballers
Primera B de Chile players
Chilean Primera División players
Naval de Talcahuano footballers
Deportes Concepción (Chile) footballers
Provincial Osorno footballers
Santiago Morning footballers
Association football midfielders